Combretum caffrum is the Eastern Cape South African bushwillow tree.

Biochemistry

In C. caffrum, combretastatins A-1, A-4 and B-1 can be found.

References

caffrum
Endemic flora of South Africa